The women's 500 metres races of the 2014–15 ISU Speed Skating World Cup 2, arranged in the Taereung International Ice Rink, in Seoul, South Korea, were held on the weekend of 21–23 November 2014.

Race one was won by Nao Kodaira of Japan, while Lee Sang-hwa of South Korea came second, and Judith Hesse of Germany came third. Anice Das of the Netherlands won Division B of race one, and was thus, under the rules, automatically promoted to Division A for race two.

In race two, Lee managed to beat Kodaira, while Karolína Erbanová of the Czech Republic took the bronze. Nadezhda Aseyeva of Russia won Division B of race two.

Race 1
Race one took place on Friday, 21 November, with Division B scheduled in the morning session, at 11:50, and Division A scheduled in the afternoon session, at 16:10.

Division A

Division B

Race 2
Race two took place on Saturday, 22 November, with Division B scheduled in the morning session, at 10:38, and Division A scheduled in the afternoon session, at 15:51.

Division A

Division B

References

Women 0500
2
ISU